The Georgia's Rome Tennis Open is a tournament for professional female tennis players played on indoor hard courts. The event is classified as a $60,000 ITF Women's World Tennis Tour tournament and has been held in Rome, Georgia, United States, since 2021.

Past finals

Singles

Doubles

External links 
 ITF search 

ITF Women's World Tennis Tour
Hard court tennis tournaments
Tennis tournaments in the United States
Tennis tournaments in Georgia (U.S. state)
2021 establishments in Georgia (U.S. state)
Recurring sporting events established in 2021